is a 1991 Japanese animated series by Nippon Animation, based on the story of the real-life Austrian singing family the Trapp Family. It is a part of the World Masterpiece Theatre franchise, which adapted classic works of literature into animated TV shows. 40 episodes aired on Fuji TV.

It was based on the 1949 memoir The Story of the Trapp Family Singers by Maria von Trapp, which has also inspired the world-famous 1959 musical The Sound of Music.

Although many things were changed from the original story, unlike other adaptations such as The Sound of Music, the children's names are all correct in this version, though some are shuffled around.

Characters
Maria Kutschera von Trapp (voiced by Masako Katsuki) – 18 years old. She is sent to the von Trapp house as a governess.
Georg von Trapp (voiced by Katsunosuke Hori) – 38 years old. Head of the von Trapp family. Loving towards his children.
Rupert von Trapp (voiced by Shinobu Adachi) – 14 years old. Firstborn of Baron von Trapp. He is a fencer.
Hedwig von Trapp (voiced by Maria Kawamura) – 13 years old. The oldest daughter of Baron von Trapp. Hates Maria at first before warming up to her.
Werner von Trapp (voiced by Yōko Matsuoka) – 10 years old. A very playful boy.
Maria von Trapp (voiced by Yuri Shiratori) – 8 years old. The second oldest daughter of Baron von Trapp. Very close to her deceased mother, Agatha. She is the reason Maria was sent to the von Trapp house as a governess.
Johanna von Trapp (voiced by Hiromi Ishikawa) – 6 years old. A girl who laughs a lot and is put under Maria's care as well.
Martina von Trapp (voiced by Saori Suzuki) – 4 years old. She always brings her teddy bear, Nikola, everywhere.
Agathe von Trapp (voiced by Naoto Watanabe) – 3 years old. The youngest daughter of Baron von Trapp.
Johannes von Trapp – born in the series finale.
Hans (voiced by Masato Hirano) – the von Trapp family butler. He is eventually revealed to support Germany near the end of the series.
Baroness Matilda (voiced by Toshiko Fujita) – head of the von Trapp household servants, she is an aristocrat who came to assist Baron von Trapp in caring for his children and running his household after the death of his wife.
Mimi (voiced by Junko Hagimori) – a young maid who works for the Trapp family until she goes to marry her boyfriend.
Rosy – head cook of the household.
Clarine (voiced by Kyōko Irokawa) – baroness Matilda's maid who accompanies her during Matilda's time at the von Trapp household.
Franz (voiced by Takao Ōyama) – the Trapp family gardener.
Dr. Vortman – a Jewish doctor who helps the von Trapp family multiple times during the series; he is taken away by the Germans.
Mother Abbess – head of Nonnberg Abbey. She sent Maria to the Trapp family as governess.
Rafaela (voiced by Aya Hisakawa) – friend of Maria during her time at the abbey.
Dolores – mistress of novices in the abbey.
Thomas – a boy attending the school Maria briefly taught at while training to be a sister of Nonnberg Abbey. He later plays an important role in helping Hedwig reunite with her family after she ran away from home and was robbed of her valuables.
Sister Lucia – sister of the abbey who rarely speaks.
Sister Laura – sister of the abbey who helped Maria teach the children Bible study.
Hannah – a novice of Nonnberg Abbey, along with Elizabeth, both of whom share the same room as Maria and Rafaela.
Elizabeth – a novice of Nonnberg Abbey, along with Hannah, both of whom share the same room as Maria and Rafaela.
Karl – Mimi's boyfriend. He helps the Trapp family flee towards Italy as Germany was about to close its borders, including the annexed Austria.
Lady Yvonne Belvedere (voiced by Eiko Yamada) – daughter of Earl Belvedere and supposed fiancée of Baron Georg von Trapp.
Kurt Schuschnigg – president of Austria.
Franz Wasner (voiced by Katsuji Mori) – a priest who comes to live at the house nearing the end of the series.
Dennis Wagner – a talent scout from the U.S. who visits Austria to watch the Trapp family perform at a concert.
Lotte Lehmann – renowned German opera singer who discovers the Trapp Family Singers when she arrives at their home to rent out a room. She convinces them to perform in front of an audience at the Salzburg festival.
Marian Anderson – mentioned only. Famous opera singer from America who performed in Vienna at a concert the same day as the Trapps.
Unnamed High-Ranking Member of the Gestapo – a Nazi with a menacing presence, closely resembling the likeness of Reinhard Heydrich.
Adolf Hitler – dictator of Germany from 1933 to 1945.

Episodes

 My Aspiration to be a Catholic Nun
 My Future as a Sister
 The Captain and his 7 Children
 The 26th Governess
 Maria is the Cause of Drama
 The Missing children and the Hunger Rebellion
 I can not trust Adults
 Courtesy is Important!?
 Baron Trapp's Fiance?
 Sewing Machine and Violin
 Playing in the Mud is Supreme
 Chocolate Cake: Maria Style
 Don Quixote's First Love
 The Music Box's Secret
 Martina and the Bear, Nikola
 The House without Fraulein Maria
 The Wounded Fawn
 All God's Creatures, Great and Small
 Lady Yvonne's Gifts
 Each Person's Life
 Baron von Trapp's Decision
 Can You Live Alone?
 Letters to the Angel
 Christmas Carol
 In The Snow Of The Alps
 The Orange and the Flower Seeds
 Yesterday, Today and Tomorrow
 Naughty Agathe
 Person Who Becomes Wife and Mother
 Marriage?
 God's Decree
 A Bride in July
 A True Family
 The Trapp Family Singers
 Singing in the Wind
 The German Invasion
 The New Salute
 Hans' Secret
 Pride and Belief
 Farewell to My Country

Music

Opening themes
The opening theme differed depending on the broadcasting. The series first used " (Doremi Song)" as the intro theme during earlier broadcasting, however, the DVD and video version of the series uses " (Smile Magic)" as the new opening song.

"Doremi Song []" by Eri Itō and Children's Choir of the Forest (early broadcasting version). This was a Japanese adaptation of the song Do-Re-Mi from The Sound of Music.

"Smile Magic []" by Eri Itō (video, DVD, and later rebroadcasting version)

Ending themes
 "With Outstretched Hands []" by Eri Itō

References

External links 

1991 anime television series debuts
Drama anime and manga
Historical anime and manga
Romance anime and manga
Period television series
World Masterpiece Theater series
Television series based on actual events
Television shows set in Austria
Television series set in the 1930s
Trapp family
World War II television series
Cultural depictions of Adolf Hitler
ORF (broadcaster)